Awaran District (Balochi and ), is a district in the south of the Balochistan province of Pakistan. It was created as a separate district in November 1992; but previously it was a sub-division of Khuzdar District. The old name of Awaran was Kolwa. It is considered the poorest district in the province.

It is located in the south of the Balochistan province, Awaran district is bordered by Gwadar to its south and south west, Lasbela to its east and south, Kech and Panjgur to its west, Khuzdar to its north east and Kharan to its north.

Administrative divisions
The district is administratively subdivided into the following three tehsils, which are sub-divided into eight union councils:

  Awaran
 Awaran
 Gishkaur
 Teertage
  Jhal Jhao
 Camp Jahoo
 Korak
  Mashkai
 Gajjar
 Nokjo
 Parwar

Demographics
The population of the district was as follows:
 1981 census: 110,353
 1998 census: 118,173
 2017 census: 121,680

At the time of the 2017 census the district had a population of 121,821, of which 63,063 were males and 58,749 females. Rural population was 87,584 (71.90%) while the urban population was 34,237 (28.10%). The literacy rate was 25.47% - the male literacy rate was 34.34% while the female literacy rate was 15.90%. 160 people in the district were from religious minorities.

Apart from the Muslims there is a small Zikri minority. The major tribes are the Bizenjo, Muhammad Hassani, Sajidi, Siapad, Mirwani, Rakhshani, Sumalani and Qambrani.

Languages

At the time of the 2017 census, 94.61% of the population spoke Balochi and 4.15% Brahui as their first language.

Balochi accounted for % of the population in the 1998 census. The previous census of 1981 reported that % of the households in the then subdivision of Awaran had Brahui as a first language.

Agriculture
Awaran is known as oasis of dates. Annual production of dates is approx 15,000 ton.  Beside dates, onion is grown on large scale; estimated annual production is 53,000 tons. Wheat and barley are the other major Rabi crop. Kharif crops are fruits and pulses.

Education 
According to Pakistan District Education Ranking 2017, a report by Alif Ailaan, district Awaran is ranked at number 137 nationally, with an education score of 37.65. The learning score of Awaran is 42.13 and gender parity is at 43.37.

The national rank according to Readiness is 148, with a readiness score of 26.47 and primary ratio of 22.17 and gender parity of 30.77. The school infrastructure score is at 20.09 giving district Awaraan a national ranking of 146. Availability of electricity and functional toilets in schools are a major issue in Awaran.

See also
Bazdad

References

Bibliography

External links

 Awaran District at www.balochistan.gov.pk
 District Awaran -  Balochistan Police

 
Districts of Pakistan
Districts of Balochistan, Pakistan